Georgios Psykhos (born 5 February 1973) is a Greek former water polo player who competed in the 1996 Summer Olympics (6th place), the 2000 Summer Olympics (10th place) with the Greece men's national water polo team. He was part of the Greece national team that won the silver medal at the 1997 World Cup in Athens.

At club level, Psykhos had a successful career, playing most notably for Olympiacos and NC Vouliagmeni. As a member of Olympiacos (1999–2006), Psykhos won 1 LEN Champions League, 1 LEN Super Cup, 6 Greek Championships and 5 Greek Cups. He was a key player in Olympiacos' 2002 Quardruple (LEN Champions League, LEN Super Cup, Greek Championship, Greek Cup all in 2002). As a member of NC Vouliagmeni, Psykhos won the 1997 LEN Cup Winners' Cup.

Honours

Club
Olympiacos
 LEN Champions League (1): 2001–02
 LEN Super Cup (1): 2002
 Greek Championship (6): 2000, 2001, 2002, 2003, 2004, 2005
 Greek Cup (5): 2001, 2002, 2003, 2004, 2006

Vouliagmeni
 LEN Cup Winners' Cup (1) : 1996–97
 Greek Cup (1): 1996

National team
  Silver Medal in 1997 World Cup, Athens
 6th place in 1996 Olympic Games, Atlanta

References

External links
 profile at water-polo.studioidea.gr

1973 births
Living people
Greek male water polo players
Olympiacos Water Polo Club players
Olympic water polo players of Greece
Water polo players at the 1996 Summer Olympics
Water polo players at the 2000 Summer Olympics
21st-century Greek people